Gujarat Lions were a franchise cricket team based in Rajkot, Gujarat, India, which played in the Indian Premier League (IPL) for two seasons between 2016 and 2017. They were one of the eight teams which competed in the 2016 Indian Premier League. The team was captained by Suresh Raina and coached by Brad Hodge.

Standings

Squad 

Source:

Match log

Qualifier 1

Qualifier 2

References

Indian Premier League
2016 Indian Premier League